Vladimír Jánoš (born 23 November 1945) is a Czech rower who competed for Czechoslovakia in the 1968 Summer Olympics, in the 1972 Summer Olympics, and in the 1976 Summer Olympics.

He was born in Prague. In 1968 he was a crew member of the Czechoslovak boat which finished fifth in the eight event. Four years later he won the bronze medal with the Czechoslovak boat in the coxed four competition. At the 1976 Games he was part of the Czechoslovak boat that finished fourth in the coxed four contest.

References

1945 births
Living people
Czech male rowers
Czechoslovak male rowers
Olympic rowers of Czechoslovakia
Rowers at the 1968 Summer Olympics
Rowers at the 1972 Summer Olympics
Rowers at the 1976 Summer Olympics
Olympic bronze medalists for Czechoslovakia
Olympic medalists in rowing
Medalists at the 1972 Summer Olympics
European Rowing Championships medalists
Rowers from Prague